NIIT Limited (National Institute of Information Technology) is an Indian multinational skills and talent development corporation headquartered in Gurgaon, India. The company was set up in 1981 to help the nascent IT industry overcome its human resource challenges. NIIT offers training and development to individuals, enterprises and institutions.

History 
NIIT was established in 1981 by Rajendra S. Pawar and Vijay K. Thadani, graduates from IIT Delhi, with one million rupees.
NIIT conceived a franchising model in IT education for the very first time, setting up nine centers by 1987.

In 1986, NIIT began its foray into the software domain, beginning with Software Product Distribution under the 'Insoft' brand. The company also began offering advice and consultancy to large corporations on how to leverage technology and make optimum use of their IT investments.

In 1988, NIIT introduced many marketing and advertising strategies for the Indian market including the 'Computer drome' in 1990. Another initiative launched by NIIT, was its Bhavishya Jyoti Scholarships program, launched in 1991, which was targeted at deserving and socially challenged students with an aim to improve their skills and employability quotient.

NIIT, which stands for National Institute of Information Technology, was actually founded in 1981, not 1986. It is a global skills and talent development company that offers a range of training programs and services in the fields of IT, digital transformation, and other emerging technologies.

NIIT has its headquarters in Gurugram, India and operates in over 30 countries worldwide, with a focus on providing career-oriented training programs for students and professionals. Over the years, the company has received numerous awards and accolades for its innovative training methodologies and commitment to quality education.

It's worth noting that while NIIT is primarily focused on IT and digital skills training, it also offers programs in areas such as business management, finance, and marketing. The company has evolved over the years to meet the changing needs of the job market and the demands of the digital age.

In 1992, NIIT launched its flagship program GNIIT, an industry-endorsed course with a 12-month Professional Practice for students seeking careers in the IT and non-IT sectors. 
By 1993, the NIIT stock began trading on Indian stock exchanges. In 1996, NIIT began its globalization journey, setting up an education center in Hong Kong. In the same year, the company launched its virtual university 'NetVarsity'. In 1998, NIIT joined a handful of Indian tech companies to enter the Chinese market.
 
The company earned the epithet, the 'McDonald's of the software business' by Far Eastern Economic Review in September, 2001. The same year, NIIT launched an experiment that was christened 'Hole-in-the-Wall' by media and drew international attention. The experiment was based on the ‘minimally invasive education’ methodology developed by NIIT R&D. It suggested that children, irrespective of their social, ethnic, or educational identity could learn to use computers by themselves, without adult intervention.
In 2003, NIIT launched its MindChampions Academy (MCA) with Viswanathan Anand, five-time former World Chess champion and NIIT Brand Ambassador. 

In 2004, NIIT sectioned off its software business into an independent organization called NIIT Technologies Ltd. (Source: NASSCOM's 2013–14 Ranking of Top 20 IT services companies).  
In the area of training, NIIT launched its 'Edgeineers' program in 2005, to boost career opportunities for engineering graduates. In 2006, it diversified into various new sectors for training, such as banking, finance and insurance (through IFBI), executive management education (through NIIT Imperia brand), Professional Life Skills training and business process management training (through Evolv and NIIT Uniqua).

In 2009, NIIT University (NU), a not-for-profit University was established, under section 2(f) of UGC Act and notified by the Government of Rajasthan.

In 2014, NIIT tied up with National Skill Development Corporation to launch NIIT Yuva Jyoti centers, under the pilot phase of Prime Minister Narendra Modi's Skill India campaign and the Pradhan Mantri Kaushal Vikas Yojana (PMKVY) in North East, J&K and Jharkhand.

In May 2019, Baring Private Equity Asia had acquired controlling stake of NIIT Ltd in NIIT Technologies Ltd.

In August 2020, NIIT Technologies Ltd. rebranded itself and began operating under the name Coforge Limited.

Acquisitions
In 2001, NIIT acquired Osprey Systems, DEI and Click2learn in the US, to establish its e-learning and corporate learning practices in that country.

In 2006, NIIT acquired Element K, a provider of learning solutions in North America. Subsequently, Element K was sold off in 2012.

On October 1, 2021 NIIT announced the acquisition of a 70% stake acquisition in RPS Consulting, a Bengaluru based training company.

Financial controversy
On June 9, 2022, the Securities and Exchange Board of India concluded an investigation regarding insider trading within NIIT Technologies. The investigation verified that insider trading had occurred, as a result of a corporate announcement made on behalf of NIIT on the floor of the National Stock Exchange of India on March 23, 2015.

NIIT subsidiaries 

 NIIT (USA), Inc.
 NIIT Ireland Ltd
 NIIT Institute of Finance, Banking & Insurance Training Ltd.
 NIIT China (Shanghai) Limited
 NIIT Antilles NV
 NIIT Learning Solutions (Canada) Limited
 Learning Universe Private Limited
 NIIT Institute of Process Excellence Ltd.

Timeline 
 
 1981: NIIT was established by Rajendra S. Pawar and Vijay K. Thadani to optimize on the opportunity of booming IT education and training in India
 1982: Setup educational centres in Mumbai and Chennai; Introduced Multimedia technology in education
 1983: Corporate training program introduced
 1984: IT consultancy service started
 1985: Head Office integrated at New Delhi
 1986: Software product distribution started under "Insoft" brand
 1987: Conceived Franchising Model of education
 1990: Created the Computer drome to provide unlimited computer time to students
 1991: First overseas office set up in US; "Bhavishya Jyoti Scholarships" launched for meritorious and socially challenged students
 1992: GNIIT program started with professional practice
 1993: Received ISO 9001 for software export; Listed on BSE
 1995: NIIT tied up with Microsoft to provide education of Microsoft technologies
 1996: First overseas education center launched; Launched "NetVarsity", the virtual University; Awarded ISO 9001 for Computer Education
 1997: NIIT was the first Indian Company to be assessed at SEI CMM Level 5 for Software Business; Unique distinction puts NIIT into first list of 21st Global companies
 1999: Achieved the status of Microsoft's best training partner in Asia; Five time World Champion Viswanathan Anand became NIIT Brand Ambassador; Started Hole-in-the-Wall (HiWEl) experiment for disadvantaged children.
 2000: Tied up with Oracle Corporation to provide education on Oracle technologies specially on Oracle Database; Collaborated with Sun Microsystems on "iForce initiatives on computing giant"
 2001: Microsoft awarded NIIT the "Best Training Company Award"
 2003: Launched NIIT MindChampions Academy with Viswanathan Anand to promote chess in schools.
 2004: Global Solutions Business spun off into NIIT Technologies; Industry endorsed GNIIT curriculum was launches; NIIT and Intel signed a deal to use technology-assisted learning in school
 2005: Launch of NIIT IT Aptitude Test (NITAT)
 2006: Launched new businesses called NIIT Litmus which provides testing & assessment services for IT&ITES organizations, NIIT Imperia which would provide three certificate programs from Indian Institutes of Management and IFBI - Institute of Finance Banking and Insurance (NIIT IFBI)
 2009: Founded and commenced new "NIIT University" campus in Neemrana, Rajasthan offering more post graduation level courses.
 2011: Launch of NIIT Yuva Jyoti Limited (NYJL)- a joint venture between NIIT and NSDC to fuel growth in Skills & Employability for youth across India
 2012: Launch of Digital Marketing Program; NIIT received 'Top IT Training Company Award 2012' for the 20th year in succession by Cybermedia publications.
 2013: NIIT, NIIT University entered into a MoU with Autodesk to evangelize design as a learning discipline in India; NIIT launched 'Program in Business Analytics'; NIIT launches NIIT Cloud Campus: A pioneering initiative undertaken to help take high quality educational programs to the remotest corners of the country; NIIT enters Test Preparation Market with CTET Coaching
 2014: NIIT launches its new persona based website www.niit.com
 2015: Internet and Mobile Association of India (IAMAI) recognizes NIIT as the "Best Educational Website"; NIIT enters into MoU with Guian New Area, China
2016: Launch of Training.com to offer online training
2017: Sapnesh Lalla takes charge as the CEO of NIIT Ltd.
In May 2019, Baring Private Equity Asia had acquired controlling stake of NIIT Ltd in NIIT Technologies Ltd.

Business units

NIIT has two main lines of business across the globe – Corporate Learning Group and Skills & Careers Business.

NIIT's Corporate Learning Group (CLG) offers Managed Training Services (MTS) to market-leading companies in North America, Europe, Asia, and Oceania. The Skills & Careers Business (SNC) delivers a diverse range of learning and talent development programs to millions of individual and corporate learners in areas including Digital Transformation, Banking, Finance & Insurance, Retail Sales Enablement, Digital Media Marketing, and new-age IT. NIIT has incubated, StackRoute, as a digital transformation partner for corporates to build multi-skilled full stack developers at scale.

See also 
 
 Education in India
 Information technology in India
 List of Indian IT companies
 Professional certification
 Professional certification (computer technology)
 Aptech

References

External links 
 

Education companies established in 1981
Companies based in Gurgaon
Educational institutions established in 1981
For-profit universities and colleges
1981 establishments in Haryana
Companies listed on the National Stock Exchange of India
Companies listed on the Bombay Stock Exchange